The Southern Amalgamated Workers' Union (AWUNZ) is a trade union in New Zealand. It is one of three autonomous unions, with the Northern Amalgamated Workers' Union, and the Central Amalgamated Workers' Union, who operate nationally as the Amalgamated Workers' Union.

The AWUNZ is a member of the New Zealand Council of Trade Unions.

External links
 AWUNZ official site.

New Zealand Council of Trade Unions
Trade unions in New Zealand